Chris Saari is a retired American soccer midfielder who played professionally in the American Professional Soccer League and Major Indoor Soccer League.

Saari graduated from Nathan Hale High School.  He then played soccer at The Evergreen State College from 1986 to 1989.  In 1990, he played for the Seattle Storm of the American Professional Soccer League.  In the fall of 1990, he signed with the Tacoma Stars of the Major Indoor Soccer League.  He played one game, scoring one goal, for the Stars in January 1991.

In 2004, Saari became the Port Angeles High School boys' soccer coach.

References

External links
 MISL stats

1962 births
Living people
Soccer players from Seattle
American soccer players
American Professional Soccer League players
Seattle Storm (soccer) players
Major Indoor Soccer League (1978–1992) players
Tacoma Stars players
Association football midfielders